Ngumbarl is an extinct Nyulnyulan language formerly spoken in Western Australia.

In the early twentieth century Daisy Bates and Billingee recorded a word list of Ngumbarl language material.

References

Nyulnyulan languages